Sir John Duncombe (1622 – 4 March 1687) was an English politician  who sat in the House of Commons from 1660 to 1679. He served as Chancellor of the Exchequer between 1672 and 1676.

Duncombe was the son of William Duncombe of Battlesden and his wife Elizabeth Poyntz, daughter of Sir John Poyntz of South Ockendon, Essex and was baptised on 29 July 1622. He was educated at Eton College and Christ's College, Cambridge. He was knighted in 1648.

In 1660, Duncombe was elected Member of Parliament for Bury St Edmunds in the Convention Parliament. He was re-elected MP for Bury St Edmunds in 1661 for the Cavalier Parliament. He was Chancellor of the Exchequer from 22 November 1672 to 2 May 1676.

References

1622 births
1687 deaths
Chancellors of the Exchequer of England
People educated at Eton College
Alumni of Christ's College, Cambridge
English MPs 1660
English MPs 1661–1679